Neodiphthera is a genus of moths in the family Saturniidae. It was described by David Stephen Fletcher in 1982.

Species
Neodiphthera albicera (Rothschild & Jordan, 1907)
Neodiphthera aruensis U. Paukstadt, L. Paukstadt & Suhardjono, 2003
Neodiphthera buruensis Brechlin, 2005
Neodiphthera ceramensis (Bouvier, 1928)
Neodiphthera decellei (Lemaire & Naessig, 2002)
Neodiphthera elleri (Eckerlein, 1935)
Neodiphthera excavus (Lane, 1995)
Neodiphthera foucheri (Bouvier, 1928)
Neodiphthera gazellae (Niepelt, 1934)
Neodiphthera goodgeri (d`Abrera, 1998)
Neodiphthera habemana Brechlin, 2005
Neodiphthera intermedia (Bouvier, 1928)
Neodiphthera joiceyi (Bouvier, 1928)
Neodiphthera monacha (Staudinger, 1920)
Neodiphthera papuana (Rothschild, 1904)
Neodiphthera rhythmica (Turner, 1936)
Neodiphthera roicki Brechlin, 2005
Neodiphthera saccopoea (Turner, 1924)
Neodiphthera sahulensis U. Paukstadt, L. Paukstadt & Suhardjono, 2003
Neodiphthera schaarschmidti Brechlin, 2005
Neodiphthera sciron (Westwood, 1881)
Neodiphthera strandi (Niepelt, 1934)
Neodiphthera strigata (Bethune-Baker, 1908)
Neodiphthera sulphurea (Lane & Naumann, 2003)
Neodiphthera talboti (Bouvier, 1928)
Neodiphthera tennenti (Naessig & Lemaire, 2002)
Neodiphthera venusta (Rothschild & Jordan, 1907)

References

Saturniinae